The Burlington County Institute of Technology Medford Campus is a four-year countywide vocational-technical public high school serving students in ninth through twelfth grades from Burlington County, New Jersey, United States, as part of the Burlington County Institute of Technology. Located in Medford, the campus is one of two high schools in the district, along with the Westampton campus.

As of the 2021–22 school year, the school had an enrollment of 870 students and 68.5 classroom teachers (on an FTE basis), for a student–teacher ratio of 12.7:1. There were 163 students (18.7% of enrollment) eligible for free lunch and 39 (4.5% of students) eligible for reduced-cost lunch.

Athletics
The BCIT Medford Jaguars compete in the Burlington County Scholastic League, an athletic conference comprised of public and private high schools located in Burlington County and the surrounding counties that operates under the aegis of the New Jersey State Interscholastic Athletic Association (NJSIAA) With 602 students in grades 10-12, the school was classified by the NJSIAA for the 2019–20 school year as Group II for most athletic competition purposes, which included schools with an enrollment of 486 to 758 students in that grade range.

Administration   
The school's principal is Michael Parker. His administration team includes two assistant principals.

Notable alumni
 Myles Powell (born 1997), basketball player for the Seton Hall Pirates men's basketball team.

References

External links
Burlington County Institute of Technology Medford Campus

School Data for Burlington County Institute of Technology, National Center for Education Statistics
Medford Campus Alumni

Medford, New Jersey
Public high schools in Burlington County, New Jersey
Vocational schools in New Jersey